Vaychi, Vayechi or Vayhi (—Hebrew for "and he lived," the first word of the parashah) is the twelfth weekly Torah portion (parashah) in the annual Jewish cycle of Torah reading and the last in the Book of Genesis. It constitutes . The parashah tells of Jacob's request for burial in Canaan, Jacob's blessing of Joseph's sons Ephraim and Manasseh, Jacob's blessing of his sons, Jacob's death and burial, and Joseph's death.

It is the shortest weekly Torah portion in the Book of Genesis (although not in the Torah). It is made up of 4,448 Hebrew letters, 1,158 Hebrew words, 85 verses, and 148 lines in a Torah scroll. Jews read it the twelfth Sabbath after Simchat Torah, generally in December or January.

Readings
In the Masoretic Text of the Tanakh (Hebrew Bible), Parashat Vayechi has 12 "open portion" (petuchah) divisions (roughly equivalent to paragraphs, often abbreviated with the Hebrew letter  (peh)). Parashat Vayechi has no "closed portion" (setumah) divisions (abbreviated with the Hebrew letter  (samekh)) within those open portion divisions. Unlike other parashot, Parashat Vaychi does not begin after a space or on a new line. The first open portion spans the first three readings. Ten further open portion divisions separate Jacob's blessings for his sons in the fifth and sixth readings. The final, twelfth open portion spans the concluding sixth and seventh readings.

First reading—Genesis 47:28–48:9
In the first reading, Jacob lived in Egypt 17 years, and lived to be 147 years old. When Jacob's death drew near, he called his son Joseph and asked him to put his hand under Jacob's thigh and swear not to bury him in Egypt, but to bury him with his father and grandfather. Joseph agreed, but Jacob insisted that he swear to, and so he did, and Jacob bowed. Later, when one told Joseph that his father was sick, Joseph took his sons Manasseh and Ephraim to see him. Jacob sat up and told Joseph that God appeared to him at Luz, blessed him, and told him that God would multiply his descendants and give them that land forever. Jacob adopted Joseph's sons as his own and granted them inheritance with his own sons. Jacob recalled how when he came from Paddan, Rachel died on the way, and he buried her on the way to Ephrath, near Bethlehem. Jacob saw Joseph's sons and asked who they were, and Joseph told him that they were the sons whom God had given him in Egypt, so Jacob asked Joseph to bring them near so that he might bless them. The first reading ends here.

Second reading—Genesis 48:10–16
In the second reading, Jacob's sight had dimmed with age, so Joseph brought his sons near, and Jacob kissed them and embraced them. Jacob told Joseph that he had not thought to see his face, and now God had let him see his children, as well. Joseph took them from between his knees, bowed deeply, and brought them to Jacob, with Ephraim in his right hand toward Jacob's left hand, and Manasseh in his left hand toward Jacob's right hand. But Jacob laid his right hand on Ephraim, the younger, and his left hand on Manasseh, the firstborn, and prayed that God bless the lads, let Jacob's name be named in them, and let them grow into a multitude. The second reading ends here.

Third reading—Genesis 48:17–22
In the third reading, it displeased Joseph that Jacob laid his right hand on Ephraim, and he lifted Jacob's right hand to move it to Manasseh the firstborn, but Jacob refused, saying that Manasseh would also become a great people, but his younger brother would be greater. Jacob blessed them, saying Israel would bless by invoking God to make one like Ephraim and as Manasseh. Jacob told Joseph that he was dying, but God would be with him and bring him back to the land of his fathers, and Jacob had given him a portion (shechem) above his brothers, which he took from the Amorites with his sword and bow. The third reading and the first open portion end here.

Fourth reading—Genesis 49:1–18
In the fourth reading, Jacob gathered his sons and asked them to listen to what would befall them in time. Jacob called Reuben his firstborn, his might, and the first-fruits of his strength; unstable as water, he would not have the best because he defiled his father's bed. The second open portion ends here.

In the continuation of the reading, Jacob called Simeon and Levi brothers in violence, prayed that his soul not come into their council—for in their anger they slew men and beasts—and cursed their descendants to be scattered throughout Israel. The third open portion ends here.

In the continuation of the reading, Jacob called Judah a lion's whelp and told him that he would dominate his enemies, his brothers would bow before him, and his descendants would rule as long as men came to Shiloh. Binding his foal to the vine, he would wash his garments in wine, and his teeth would be white with milk. The fourth open portion ends here.

In the continuation of the reading, Jacob foretold that Zebulun's descendants would dwell at the shore near Sidon, and would work the ships. The fifth open portion ends here.

As the reading continues, Jacob called Issachar a large-boned donkey couching between the sheep-folds, he bowed his shoulder to work, and his descendants would dwell in a pleasant land. The sixth open portion ends here.

In the continuation of the reading, Jacob called Dan a serpent in the road that bites the horse's heels, and he would judge his people. Jacob interjected that he longed for God's salvation. The fourth reading and the seventh open portion end here.

Fifth reading—Genesis 49:19–26
In the fifth reading, Jacob foretold that raiders would raid Gad, but he would raid on their heels. The eighth open portion ends here.

In the continuation of the reading, Jacob foretold that Asher's bread would be the richest, and he would yield royal dainties. The ninth open portion ends here.

As the reading continues, Jacob called Naphtali a hind let loose, and he would give good words. The tenth open portion ends here.

In the continuation of the reading, Jacob called Joseph a fruitful vine by a fountain whose branches ran over the wall, archers shot at him, but his bow remained firm; Jacob blessed him with blessings of heaven above and the deep below, blessings of the breasts and womb, and mighty blessings on the head of the prince among his brethren. The fifth reading and the eleventh open portion end here.

Sixth reading—Genesis 49:27–50:20
In the long sixth reading, Jacob called Benjamin a ravenous wolf that devours its prey. The editor summarises: "these are the twelve tribes". And Jacob charged his sons to bury him with his fathers in the cave of Machpelah that Abraham bought and where they buried Abraham and Sarah, Isaac and Rebekah, and where he buried Leah. And then Jacob gathered his feet into his bed and died. Joseph kissed his father's face and wept. Joseph commanded the physicians to embalm Jacob, and they did so over the next 40 days, and the Egyptians wept for Jacob 70 days. Thereafter, Joseph asked Pharaoh's courtiers to tell Pharaoh that Jacob had made Joseph swear to bury him in the land of Canaan and ask that he might go up, bury his father, and return. Pharaoh consented, and Joseph went up with all Pharaoh's court, Egypt's elders, chariots, horsemen, and all Joseph's relatives, leaving only the little ones and the flocks and herds behind in the land of Goshen. At the threshing-floor of Atad, beyond the Jordan River, they mourned for his father seven days, and the Canaanites remarked at how grievous the mourning was for the Egyptians, and thus the place was named Abel-mizraim. Jacob's sons carried out his command and buried him in the cave of Machpelah, and the funeral party returned to Egypt. With Jacob's death, Joseph's brothers grew concerned that Joseph would repay them for the evil that they had done, and they sent Joseph a message that Jacob had commanded him to forgive them. When the brothers spoke to Joseph, he wept, and his brothers fell down before him and declared that they were his bondmen. Joseph told them not to fear, for he was not God, and even though they had intended him evil, God meant it for good, to save many people. The sixth reading ends here.

Seventh reading—Genesis 50:21–26
In the seventh reading, Joseph spoke kindly to them, comforted them, and committed to sustain them and their little ones. Joseph lived 110 years, saw Ephraim's children of the third generation, and grandchildren of Manasseh were born on Joseph's knees. Joseph told his brothers that he was dying, but God would surely remember them and bring them out of Egypt to the land that God had sworn to Abraham, Isaac, and Jacob. Joseph made the children of Israel swear to carry his bones to that land. So Joseph died, and they embalmed him, and put him in a coffin in Egypt. The seventh reading, the twelfth open portion, the parashah, and the Book of Genesis all end here.

Readings according to the triennial cycle
Jews who read the Torah according to the triennial cycle of Torah reading read the parashah according to the following schedule:

In ancient parallels
The parashah has parallels in these ancient sources:

Genesis chapter 50
Gerhard von Rad argued that the Joseph narrative is closely related to earlier Egyptian wisdom writings.

In inner-biblical interpretation
The parashah has parallels or is discussed in these Biblical sources:

Genesis chapter 49

Genesis chapter 50
When Joseph in  told his brothers that they meant evil against him, but God meant it for good to save the lives of many people, he echoed his explanation in  that God sent him to Egypt before his brothers to preserve life. Similarly,  reports that God called a famine upon the land and sent Joseph before the children of Israel.

The horse is prepared against the day of battle; but victory is of the Lord.”

In classical rabbinic interpretation
The parashah is discussed in these rabbinic sources from the era of the Mishnah and the Talmud:

Genesis Chapter 47
Reading , "Jacob lived in the land of Egypt seventeen years," the Midrash HaGadol asked whether he lived only seventeen years. The Midrash explained that Jacob spent these years in prosperity, happiness, and peace, so that one might say that only then did he really live. Thus,  applies to Jacob when it says, "Though your beginning was small, yet your end should greatly increase." For the wicked enjoy happiness at first, but finally suffer endless sorrow, while the righteous experience suffering at first, but endless joy in the end, as  promises, "Everlasting joy shall be upon their heads."

Reading , "Jacob lived in the land of Egypt seventeen years," the Midrash HaGadol explained that these correspond to the 17 years that Joseph lived in his father’s home. Thus, for the 17 years that Jacob sustained Joseph, Joseph in turn sustained Jacob for the same period, measure for measure.

Rabbi Joḥanan taught that trouble follows whenever Scripture employs the word , vayeishev, meaning "and he settled." Thus "Israel settled" in  presaged trouble in the report of  that Israel's death drew near.

Yet Jacob disregarded them and called Joseph, because Joseph had the means of fulfilling Jacob's wishes.

Rabbi Eliezer taught that in the hour of Jacob's death, he called to his son Joseph, and adjured him to swear to Jacob by the covenant of circumcision that Joseph would take Jacob up to the burial-place of his fathers in the Cave of Machpelah. And Rabbi Eliezer taught that Joseph kept the oath and did as he swore, as  reports.

The Midrash suggested that it was because Egypt would eventually be smitten with vermin (in the Plagues of Egypt), which would swarm about Jacob's body. Alternatively, the Midrash suggested that it was so that Egyptians should not make Jacob an object of idolatrous worship. For just as idolaters will be punished, so will their idols too be punished, as  says, "And against all the gods of Egypt I will execute judgments."

Reading , "Bury me not, I pray, in Egypt", a Midrash explained that Jacob wanted his bones to be carried away from Egypt, lest Jacob's descendants remain there, arguing that Egypt must be a holy land, or Jacob would not have been buried there. Alternatively, a Midrash taught that Jacob feared that when God afflicted the Egyptians with the Plagues, they would surround Jacob's sepulcher and beseech him to intercede for them. If he did intercede, he would be helping God's enemies. If he did not, he would cause God's Name to be profaned by the Egyptians, who would call Jacob's God inefficacious.

Alternatively, reading , "Bury me not, I pray, in Egypt", the Midrash Tehillim explained that , "Gather not my soul with sinners," alludes to the Egyptians, with whom Jacob sought not to be buried. Similarly, the Gemara taught that Jews have a rule that a righteous person may not be buried near a wicked person.

What would be lacking if he were buried elsewhere? Rabbi Shimon ben Lakish (Resh Lakish) explained in the name of Bar Kappara that Israel is the land whose dead will be resurrected first in the Messianic era.

Karna deduced from  that Jacob sought burial in Israel to ensure his resurrection. Karna reasoned that Jacob knew that he was an entirely righteous man, and that the dead outside Israel will also be resurrected, so Jacob must have troubled his sons to carry him to Canaan because he feared that he might be unworthy to travel through tunnels to the site of resurrection in Israel.

Rav Judah cited  to support the proposition that gravediggers must remove surrounding earth when they rebury a body. Rav Judah interpreted the verse to mean "carry with me [earth] of Egypt."

Rabbi Elazar read  to report that Jacob bowed to Joseph because Joseph was in power. The Gemara read Jacob's action to illustrate a saying then popular: "When the fox has its hour, bow down to it." That is, even though one would ordinarily expect the lion to be the king of beasts, when the fox has its turn to rule, one should bow to it as well. The Gemara thus viewed Joseph as the fox, to whom, in his day, even the senior Jacob bowed down.

A Midrash read  to teach that Jacob gave thanks for Leah, for  says, "And Israel bowed down [in thanksgiving] for the bed's head," and the Midrash read Leah (as the first who bore Jacob children) to be the head of Jacob's bed.

Genesis Chapter 48
Interpreting , the Gemara taught that until the time of Jacob, there was no illness (as one lived one's allotted years in health and then died suddenly). Then Jacob came and prayed, and illness came into being, as  reports, "And one told Joseph, ‘Behold, your father is sick'" (reporting sickness for the first time in the Torah). Similarly, the Pirke De-Rabbi Eliezer reported that from the creation of the Heaven and earth until then, no person had ever become ill. Rather, they would remain fit until the time they were to die. Then, wherever they would happen to be, they would sneeze, and their souls would depart through their noses. But then Jacob prayed, seeking mercy from God, asking that God not take his soul until he had an opportunity to charge his sons and all his household. And then, as  reports, "And one told Joseph, ‘Behold, your father is sick.'" Therefore, a person is duty bound to say "life!" after another sneezes.

Interpreting , the Gemara examined the consequences of Jacob's blessing of Ephraim and Manasseh. Rav Aḥa bar Jacob taught that a tribe that had an inheritance of land was called a "congregation," but a tribe that had no possession was not a "congregation." Thus, Rav Aḥa taught that the tribe of Levi was not called a "congregation." The Gemara questioned Rav Aḥa's teaching, asking whether there would then be fewer than 12 tribes. Abaye replied quoting Jacob's words in  "Ephraim and Manasseh, even as Reuben and Simeon, shall be mine." The Gemara challenged Rava's interpretation, noting that  mentions Ephraim and Manasseh separately as tribes in connection with their assembling around the camp by their banners. The Gemara replied to its own challenge by positing that their campings were like their possessions, in order to show respect to their banners. The Gemara persisted in arguing that Ephraim and Manasseh were treated separately by noting that they were also separated with regard to their princes. The Gemara responded that this was done in order to show honor to the princes and to avoid having to choose the prince of one tribe to rule over the other.  indicates that Solomon celebrated seven days of dedication of the Temple in Jerusalem, and Moses celebrated twelve days of dedication of the Tabernacle instead of seven in order to show honor to the princes and to avoid having to choose the prince of one tribe over the other.

Rav Judah said in the name of Samuel that , where grandchildren are equated with children, serves to remind the reader that cursing a husband's parents in the presence of the husband's children is just as bad as cursing them in the husband's presence. Rabbah said that an example of such a curse would be where a woman told her husband's son, "May a lion devour your grandfather."

A Baraita used  to illustrate the effect of the law of levirate marriage, where a brother marries his dead brother's wife and raises a child in the dead brother's name. Just as in  Ephraim and Manasseh were to inherit from Jacob, so in levirate marriage the brother who marries his dead brother's wife and their children thereafter were to inherit from the dead brother.

Rabbi Ḥama the son of Rabbi Ḥanina taught that our ancestors were never without a scholars' council. Abraham was an elder and a member of the scholars' council, as  says, "And Abraham was an elder well stricken in age." Eliezer, Abraham's servant, was an elder and a member of the scholars' council, as  says, "And Abraham said to his servant, the elder of his house, who ruled over all he had," which Rabbi Eleazar explained to mean that he ruled over—and thus knew and had control of—the Torah of his master. Isaac was an elder and a member of the scholars' council, as  says: "And it came to pass when Isaac was an elder." Jacob was an elder and a member of the scholars' council, as  says, "Now the eyes of Israel were dim with age." In Egypt they had the scholars' council, as  says, "Go and gather the elders of Israel together."

Rabbi Joḥanan deduced from  that sustenance is more difficult to achieve than redemption. Rabbi Joḥanan noted that in  a mere angel sufficed to bring about redemption, whereas  reported that God provided sustenance.

Rabbi Jose son of Rabbi Ḥanina deduced from  that the descendants of Joseph did not have to fear the evil eye. In , Jacob blessed Joseph's descendants to grow like fishes. Rabbi Jose son of Rabbi Ḥanina interpreted that just the eye cannot see fish in the sea that are covered by water, so the evil eye would have no power to reach Joseph's descendants.

Interpreting , Rabbi Jose's nephew taught that as he was dying, Jacob gave his sons three signs by which his descendants might recognize the true redeemer: (1) he would come using, as Jacob did, the word "I" (anoki), (2) he would appoint elders for the people, and (3) he would say to the people, "God will remember you," as Joseph did in ). Rabbi Ḥunia omitted the word "I" (anoki) and substituted God's special secret name (the Shem HaMephorash).

Rav Papa asked Abaye whether perhaps Jacob merely gave Joseph an extra palm tree. Abaye answered that  demonstrated that Jacob intended that Joseph would get two full portions "even as Reuben and Simeon." Rabbi Ḥelbo asked Rabbi Samuel bar Naḥmani why Jacob took the firstborn's birthright from Reuben and gave it to Joseph. The Gemara answered by citing  to show that Reuben lost the birthright when he defiled Jacob's bed. The Gemara asked why Joseph benefited from Reuben's disqualification. Rabbi Samuel bar Naḥmani responded with a parable of an orphan who was brought up by an adoptive father, and when he became rich, he chose to give to his adoptive father from his wealth. Similarly, because Joseph cared for Jacob, Jacob chose to give to Joseph.

Rabbi Joḥanan said that he would sit at the gate of the bathhouse (mikvah), and when Jewish women came out, they would look at him and have children as handsome as he was. The Rabbis asked him whether he was not afraid of the evil eye for being so boastful. Rabbi Abbahu taught that one should not read alei ayin ("by a fountain"), but olei ayin ("rising over the eye"). Rabbi Judah (or some say Rabbi Jose) son of Rabbi Ḥanina deduced from the words "And let them (the descendants of Joseph) multiply like fishes (ve-yidgu) in the midst of the earth" in  that just as fish (dagim) in the sea are covered by water and thus the evil eye has no power over them, so the evil eye has no power over the descendants of Joseph.

Genesis Chapter 49
The Sifre taught that Jacob demonstrated in  the model of how to admonish others when one is near death. The Sifre read  to indicate that Moses spoke to the Israelites in rebuke. The Sifre taught that Moses rebuked them only when he approached death, and the Sifre taught that Moses learned this lesson from Jacob, who admonished his sons in  only when he neared death. The Sifre cited four reasons why people do not admonish others until the admonisher nears death: (1) so that the admonisher does not have to repeat the admonition, (2) so that the one rebuked would not suffer undue shame from being seen again, (3) so that the one rebuked would not bear ill will to the admonisher, and (4) so that the one may depart from the other in peace, for admonition brings peace.

That verse reports, "And Jacob called to his sons, and said: ‘Gather yourselves together, that I may tell you what will befall you in the end of days.'" According to Rabbi Simeon, Jacob wished to reveal to his sons what would happen in the end of the days, but just then, the Divine Presence (Shechinah) departed from him. So, Jacob said that perhaps, Heaven forefend, he had fathered a son who was unworthy to hear the prophecy, just as Abraham had fathered Ishmael or Isaac had fathered Esau. But his sons answered him (in the words of ), "Hear O Israel, the Lord our God, the Lord is One," explaining that just as there was only One in Jacob's heart, so there was only One in their hearts. And Jacob replied, "Blessed be the name of God's glorious Kingdom forever and ever." The Rabbis considered that Jews might not recite those words at all, but rejected that option, as Jacob did say the words. So, the Rabbis ruled that Jews should recite the words quietly. Rabbi Isaac taught that the School of Rabbi Ammi said that one can compare this practice to that of a princess who smelled a spicy pudding. If she revealed her desire for the pudding, she would suffer disgrace; but if she concealed her desire, she would suffer deprivation. So, her servants brought her pudding secretly. Rabbi Abbahu taught that the Sages ruled that Jews should recite the words aloud, so as not to allow heretics to claim that Jews were adding improper words to the Shema. But in Nehardea, where there were no heretics so far, they recited the words quietly.

But when Reuben sinned, the birthright was transferred to Joseph, the priesthood to Levi, and the royalty to Judah.

The Rabbis of the Talmud disputed whether Reuben sinned. Rabbi Samuel bar Naḥman said in Rabbi Jonathan's name that whoever maintains that Reuben sinned errs, for  says, "Now the sons of Jacob were twelve," teaching that they were all equal in righteousness. Similarly, it was taught in a Baraita that Rabbi Simeon ben Eleazar said that the righteous Reuben was saved from sin. Rabbi Simeon ben Eleazar interpreted , "and he lay with Bilhah his father's concubine," to teach that Reuben resented his mother Leah's humiliation, and did not want Rachel's maid Bilhah to join Rachel as a rival to Leah. So, Reuben moved her bed. Others told that Reuben moved two beds, one of the Divine Presence (Shechinah) and the other of his father, as Jacob set a couch for the Divine Presence in each of his wives' tents, and he spent the night where the Divine Presence came to rest. According to this view, one should read  to say, "Then you defiled my couch on which (the Divine Presence) went up." Several Rabbis read the word , pachaz, as an acronym, each letter indicating a word. Rabbi Eliezer interpreted Jacob to tell Reuben: "You were hasty (paztah), you were guilty (ḥabtah), you disgraced (zaltah)." Rabbi Joshua interpreted: "You overstepped (pasatah) the law, you sinned (ḥatata), you fornicated (zanita)." Rabban Gamaliel interpreted: "You meditated (pillaltah) to be saved from sin, you supplicated (ḥaltah), your prayer shone forth (zarhah)." Rabban Gamaliel also cited the interpretation of Rabbi Eleazar the Modiite, who taught that one should reverse the word and interpret it: "You trembled (zi'az'ata), you recoiled (halita), your sin fled (parhah) from you." Rava (or others say Rabbi Jeremiah bar Abba) interpreted: "You remembered (zakarta) the penalty of the crime, you were grievously sick (ḥalita) through defying lust, you held aloof (pirashta) from sinning."

Rabbi Judah bar Simon read , “Blessed shall you be when you come in, and blessed shall you be when you go out,” to refer to Moses. Rabbi Judah bar Simon read “when you come in” to refer to Moses, because when he came into the world, he brought nearer to God Batya the daughter of Pharaoh (who by saving Moses from drowning merited life in the World to Come).

"Let my soul not come into their council" referred to the spies, and "unto their assembly let my glory not be united" referred to Korah's assembly.

It was taught in a Baraita that King Ptolemy brought together 72 elders and placed them in 72 separate rooms, without telling them why he had brought them together, and he asked each one of them to translate the Torah.

It was taught in a Baraita that Issi ben Judah said that there are five verses in the Torah whose meaning they could not decide, including , which one can read, "And in their self-will they crippled oxen. Cursed be their anger, for it was fierce," or one can read, "And in their self-will they crippled the cursed oxen. Their anger was fierce." (In the latter reading, "the cursed oxen" refers to Shechem, a descendant of Canaan, whom Noah cursed in ).

A Midrash taught that the words "I will divide them in Jacob" in  foretold that scribes in synagogues would descend from the tribe of Simeon, and students and teachers of Mishnah would descend from the tribe of Levi, engaged in the study of the Torah in the houses of study. (These by their profession would thus be prevented from living in masses and would be scattered.)

And in accordance with Jacob's blessing, 30 kings descended from Judah, for as  reports, David descended from Judah, and if one counts David, Solomon, Rehoboam, Abijah, Asa, Jehoshaphat and his successors until Jeconiah and Zedekiah (one finds 30 generations from Judah's son Perez to Zedekiah). And so the Midrash taught it shall be in the World To Come (the Messianic era), for as  foretells, "And David My servant shall be their prince forever."

Thus  reports, "Then his (Haman's) wise men and Zeresh his wife said to him: ‘If Mordecai . . . be of the seed of the Jews (ha-Yehudim), you shall not prevail against him.'" (The word , ha-Yehudim, can refer to both the Jews and the people of the tribe of Judah.) The Gemara reported that the wise men told Haman that if Mordecai came from another tribe, then Haman could prevail over him, but if he came from one of the tribes of Judah, Benjamin, Ephraim, or Manasseh, then Haman would not prevail over him.

Esau, Jacob, and all Jacob's children went to bury Isaac, as  reports, “Esau, Jacob, and his sons buried him,” and they were all in the Cave of Machpelah sitting and weeping. At last Jacob's children stood up, paid their respects to Jacob, and left the cave so that Jacob would not be humbled by weeping exceedingly in their presence. But Esau reentered the cave, thinking that he would kill Jacob, as  reports, “And Esau said in his heart: ‘Let the days of mourning for my father be at hand; then will I slay my brother Jacob.’” But Judah saw Esau go back and perceived at once that Esau meant to kill Jacob in the cave. Quickly Judah slipped after him and found Esau about to slay Jacob. So Judah killed Esau from behind.

The Gemara read , "The scepter shall not depart from Judah," to refer to the Exilarchs of Babylon, who ruled over Jews with scepters (symbols of the authority of a ruler appointed by the Government). The Gemara deduced from this that an authorization held from the Exilarch in Babylonia held good in both Babylonia and the Land of Israel.

And Rabbi Joḥanan taught that the world was created only for the sake of the Messiah.

When Rav Dimi came from the Land of Israel to Babylon, he taught that  foretold the wonders of the Land of Israel. In case one might imagine that the Land would not contain wine,  explicitly said, "He washes his garments in wine." In case one should say that it would not intoxicate,  states, "His vesture (susto, a cognate of hasasah, "enticement")." In case one might think that it would be tasteless,  states, "His eyes shall be red (chachlili) with wine," teaching that any palate that will taste it says, "To me, to me (li li)." And in case one might say that it would suitable for young people but not for old,  states, "And his teeth white with milk," which Rav Dimi read not as, "white teeth (uleven shinayim)," but as, "To one who is advanced in years (leven shanim)." Rav Dimi taught that the plain meaning of  conveyed that the congregation of Israel asked God to wink to them with God's eyes, which would be sweeter than wine, and show God's teeth, which would be sweeter than milk. The Gemara taught that this interpretation thus provided support for Rabbi Joḥanan, who taught that the person who smiles an affectionate, toothy smile to a friend is better than one who gives the friend milk to drink. For  says, "And his teeth white with milk," which Rabbi Joḥanan read not as "white teeth (leven shinayim)," but as, "showing the teeth (libun shinayim)."

The Gemara taught that a certain man used to say that by the seashore thorn bushes are cypresses. (That is, the thorn bushes there were as attractive as cypresses elsewhere.) They investigated and found that he descended from Zebulun, for  says, "Zebulun shall dwell at the haven of the sea."

Rabbi Joḥanan found in the words "Issachar is a large-boned donkey" in  an indication that Jacob's donkey detoured to Leah's tent, helping to cause Issachar's birth.

Rabbi Joḥanan taught in the name of Rabbi Simeon bar Yochai that  and  help to show the value of Torah study and charity. Rabbi Joḥanan equated "sowing" with "charity," as  says, "Sow to yourselves in charity, reap in kindness." And Rabbi Joḥanan equated "water" with "Torah," as  says, "Everyone who thirsts, come to the waters (that is, Torah)." Whoever engages in Torah study and charity is worthy of a canopy—that is, an inheritance—like Joseph, for  says, "Joseph is a fruitful bough . . . whose branches run over the wall." And such a person is also worthy of the inheritance of Issachar, as  says, "Issachar is a strong donkey" (which the Targum renders as rich with property). The Gemara also reported that some say that the enemies of such a person will fall before him as they did for Joseph, as  says, "With them he shall push the people together, to the ends of the earth." And such a person is worthy of understanding like Issachar, as  says, "of the children of Issachar . . . were men who had understanding of the times to know what Israel ought to do."

Citing , Rabbi Samuel bar Naḥmani said in the name of Rabbi Jonathan that when a wife summons a husband to his marital duty, they will have children such as were not to be found even in the generation of Moses. For with regard to the generation of Moses,  says, "Take wise men, and understanding and known among your tribes, and I will make them rulers over you." But  says, "So I took the chiefs of your tribes, wise men and known," without mentioning "understanding" (implying that Moses could not find men with understanding). And  says, "Issachar is a large-boned donkey" (alluding to the Midrash that Leah heard Jacob's donkey, and so came out of her tent to summon Jacob to his marital duty, as reported in ). And  says, "of the children of Issachar . . . were men who had understanding of the times to know what Israel ought to do." But the Gemara limited the teaching of Rabbi Samuel bar Naḥmani in the name of Rabbi Jonathan by counseling that such behavior is virtuous only when the wife ingratiates herself to her husband without making brazen demands.

The Gemara taught that a certain man insisted on going to court in every dispute. The Sages taught said that this proved that he descended from Dan, for  can be read, "Dan shall enter into judgment with his people, as one of the tribes of Israel."

( thus alluded to Samson, who belonged to the tribe of Dan and adopted the tactics of a serpent in fighting the Philistines.) Rabbi Joḥanan taught that Samson judged Israel in the same manner as God, as  says, "Dan shall judge his people as One" (and God is One). Rabbi Joḥanan also said that Samson was lame in both legs, as  says, "Dan shall be a serpent in the way, an adder (shefifon) in the path." (shefifon, evokes a doubling of the word , shefi, from the root , "to dislocate.")

Suffering, the sanctification of the Divine Name, the merit of the Ancestors, and the desire of the World To Come are all bound up with waiting. Thus  says, "Yea, in the way of Your judgments, O Lord, have we waited for You," which alludes to suffering. Grace comes through hope, as  says, "O Lord, be gracious to us; we have waited (hoped) for You."

God asked the Israelites whether they had lost their sense, for they should have known that Balaam would eventually descend to Gehinnom, and therefore did not wish God's salvation to come. The Midrash taught that God counseled the Israelites to wait for salvation, which is at hand, as  says, "For My salvation is near to come."

But Joseph replied that this was not what Pharaoh had seen, for they were (in the words of ) "well-favored and fat-fleshed (yifot mareh, uvriot basar)." But Joseph replied that this was not what Pharaoh had seen, for they were (in the words of ) "ill-favored and lean-fleshed (raot mareh, vedakot basar)." But Joseph replied that this was not what Pharaoh had seen, for they were (in the words of ) "healthy (beriot) and good." But Joseph replied that this was not what Pharaoh had seen, for they were (in the words of ) "thin and blasted with the east wind (dakot u-shedufot kadim)." Pharaoh began to wonder, and told Joseph that Joseph must have been behind Pharaoh when he dreamed, as  says, "Forasmuch as God has shown you all this."

Rabbi Melai taught in the name of Rabbi Isaac of Magdala that from the day that Joseph departed from his brothers he abstained from wine, reading  to report, "The blessings of your father . . . shall be on the head of Joseph, and on the crown of the head of him who was a nazirite (since his departure) from his brethren." Rabbi Jose ben Ḥaninah taught that the brothers also abstained from wine after they departed from him, for  reports, "And they drank, and were merry with him," implying that they broke their abstention "with him." But Rabbi Melai taught that the brothers did drink wine in moderation since their separation from Joseph, and only when reunited with Joseph did they drink to intoxication "with him."

The Tosefta interpreted  to allude to produce yields of Bethel and Jericho. The Tosefta interpreted "Benjamin is a wolf that pounces" to mean that the land of Benjamin, the area of Bethel, jumped to produce crops early in the growing season. The Tosefta interpreted "in the morning he devours the prey" to mean that in Jericho produce was gone from the fields early in the seventh year. And the Tosefta interpreted "and in the evening he divides the spoil" to mean that in Bethel produce remained in the fields until late in the seventh year.

One said that the cave consisted of two rooms, one farther in than the other. And the other said that it consisted of a room and a second story above it. The Gemara granted that the meaning of “Machpelah”—“double”—was understandable according to the one who said the cave consisted of one room above the other, but questioned how the cave was “Machpelah”—“double”—according to the one who said it consisted of two rooms, one farther in than the other, as even ordinary houses have two rooms. The Gemara answered that it was called “Machpelah” in the sense that it was doubled with the Patriarchs and Matriarchs, who were buried there in pairs. The Gemara compared this to the homiletic interpretation of the alternative name for Hebron mentioned in  “Mamre of Kiryat Ha’Arba, which is Hebron.” Rabbi Isaac taught that the city was called “Kiryat Ha’Arba”—“the city of four”—because it was the city of the four couples buried there: Adam and Eve, Abraham and Sarah, Isaac and Rebecca, and Jacob and Leah.

The Baraita rejected the plain meaning of "built," reasoning that Ham would not build a house for his younger son Canaan (in whose land was Hebron) before he built one for his elder son Mizraim (in whose land was Zoan, and  lists (presumably in order of birth) "the sons of Ham: Cush, and Mizraim, and Put, and Canaan." The Baraita also taught that among all the nations, there was none more fertile than Egypt, for  says, "Like the garden of the Lord, like the land of Egypt." And there was no more fertile spot in Egypt than Zoan, where kings lived, for  says of Pharaoh, "his princes are at Zoan." But rocky Hebron was still seven times as fertile as lush Zoan.

Rabbi Isaac taught in the name of Rabbi Joḥanan that Jacob did not die.  reports only that "he gathered up his feet into the bed, and expired, and was gathered unto his people.") Rav Naḥman objected that he must have died, for he was bewailed (as  reports) and embalmed (as  reports) and buried (as  reports)! Rabbi Isaac explained that since  likens Jacob to his descendants, then just as Jacob's descendants still live, so too must Jacob.

Genesis Chapter 50
Rabbi Ḥiyya bar Abba taught in the name of Rabbi Joḥanan that when in  Pharaoh conferred power on Joseph, Pharaoh's astrologers questioned whether Pharaoh would set in power over them a slave whom his master bought for 20 pieces of silver. Pharaoh replied to them that he discerned royal characteristics in Joseph. Pharaoh's astrologers said to Pharaoh that in that case, Joseph must be able to speak the 70 languages of the world. That night, the angel Gabriel came to teach Joseph the 70 languages, but Joseph could not learn them. Thereupon Gabriel added a letter from God's Name to Joseph's name, and Joseph was able to learn the languages, as  reports, "He appointed it in Joseph for a testimony, when he went out over the land of Egypt, where I (Joseph) heard a language that I knew not." The next day, in whatever language Pharaoh spoke to Joseph, Joseph was able to reply to Pharaoh. But when Joseph spoke to Pharaoh in Hebrew, Pharaoh did not understand what he said. So Pharaoh asked Joseph to teach it to him. Joseph tried to teach Pharaoh Hebrew, but Pharaoh could not learn it. Pharaoh asked Joseph to swear that he would not reveal his failing, and Joseph swore. But Joseph replied that in that case, he would also ask to be released from his oath to Pharaoh concerning Pharaoh's ignorance of languages.

Rabbi (Judah ha-Nasi) taught that at a seaport that he visited, they called selling, "kirah". In the light of Rabbi's report of the alternative usage, one can translate the phrase as "that I have bought for myself."

The Mishnah cited  for the proposition that Providence treats a person measure for measure as that person treats others.

But on the return to Egypt,  says, "And Joseph returned into Egypt, he, and his brethren, and all that went up with him to bury his father, after he had buried his father," placing the brothers before the Egyptians. Rabbi Joḥanan explained that initially, before the Egyptians saw the honor of the Children of Israel, they did not treat them with honor, so the brothers followed Pharaoh's servants. But in the end, when the Egyptians had seen the honor of the Children of Israel, they treated the brothers with honor.

Rav Ḥisda deduced from the words "and he made a mourning for his father seven days" in  that Biblical "mourning" means seven days. And thus Rav Ḥisda deduced from the words "And his soul mourns for itself" in  that a person's soul mourns for that person for seven whole days after death.

'Threshing-floor of the thorn tree'), which is in trans-Jordan [westward]," a place identified as Deir Hajlah. Both chariots and horsemen accompanied Joseph and his brothers. "And there they wailed with a very great and sore wailing," the Gemara taught that even horses and donkeys participated in the mourning.

Rabbi Tanḥuma observed that Joseph's motive was noble, for Joseph reasoned that formerly Jacob had placed Joseph above Judah, who was a king, and above Reuben, who was the firstborn, but after Jacob's death, it would not be right for Joseph to sit above them. The brothers, however, did not understand it that way, but worried that Joseph hated them. Rabbi Isaac said that the brothers feared because he had gone and looked into the pit into which they had thrown him.

Rabban Simeon ben Gamliel read  to report that Joseph's brothers fabricated Jacob's request that Joseph forgive them in order to preserve peace in the family.

Rabbi Jose bar Ḥanina noted that Joseph's brothers used the word "please" (na) three times in  when they asked Joseph, "Forgive, I pray now . . . and now we pray." Rabbi Jose bar Ḥanina deduced from this example that one who asks forgiveness of a neighbor need do so no more than three times. And if the neighbor against whom one has sinned had died, one should bring ten persons to stand by the neighbor's grave and say: "I have sinned against the Lord, the God of Israel, and against this one, whom I have hurt."

Rabbi Benjamin bar Japhet said in the name of Rabbi Elazar that  bore out the popular saying: "When the fox has its hour, bow down to it." But the Gemara questioned how Joseph was, like the fox relative to the lion, somehow inferior to his brothers.

The Mekhilta taught that in their wanderings in the Wilderness, the Israelites carried Joseph's coffin alongside the Ark of the Covenant. The nations asked the Israelites what were in the two chests, and the Israelites answered that one was the Ark of the Eternal, and the other was a coffin with a body in it. The nations then asked what was the significance of the coffin that the Israelites should carry it alongside the Ark. The Israelites answered that the one lying in the coffin had fulfilled that which was written on what lay in the Ark. On the tablets inside the Ark was written (in the words of ), "I am the Lord your God," and of Joseph it is written (in the words of ), "For, am I in the place of God?"

The Pesikta Rabbati taught that Joseph guarded himself against lechery and murder. How then can I do this great wickedness, and sin against God?"

(If ten brothers could not harm one, then how could one harm ten?)

Rabbi Jose deduced from Joseph's talk of providing in  that when Jacob died, the famine returned.

Rabbi Eliezer taught that the five Hebrew letters of the Torah that alone among Hebrew letters have two separate shapes (depending whether they are in the middle or the end of a word)— (Kh, M, N, P, Z)—all relate to the mystery of the redemption. With the letter tsade, God will redeem Israel from the oppression of the kingdoms, and God will say to Israel, I have caused a branch to spring forth for you, as  says, "Behold, the man whose name is the Branch (zemach); and he shall grow up (yizmach) out of his place, and he shall build the temple of the Lord." These letters were delivered to Abraham. Jacob's son Asher delivered the mystery of the Redemption to his daughter Serah. When Moses and Aaron came to the elders of Israel and performed signs in their sight, the elders told Serah. She told them that there is no reality in signs. The elders told her that Moses said, "God will surely visit (pakod yifkod) you" (as in ). Serah told the elders that Moses was the one who would redeem Israel from Egypt, for she heard (in the words of ), "I have surely visited (pakod pakadeti) you." The people immediately believed in God and Moses, as  says, "And the people believed, and when they heard that the Lord had visited the children of Israel."

Rav Judah asked in the name of Rav why Joseph referred to himself as "bones" during his lifetime (in ), and explained that it was because he did not protect his father's honor when in  his brothers called Jacob "your servant our father" and Joseph failed to protest. And Rav Judah also said in the name of Rav (and others say that it was Rabbi Ḥama bar Ḥanina who said) that Joseph died before his brothers because he put on superior airs.

A Baraita taught that the Serah the daughter of Asher mentioned in both  and  survived from the time Israel went down to Egypt to the time of the wandering in the Wilderness. The Gemara taught that Moses went to her to ask where the Egyptians had buried Joseph. She told him that the Egyptians had made a metal coffin for Joseph. The Egyptians set the coffin in the Nile so that its waters would be blessed. Moses went to the bank of the Nile and called to Joseph that the time had arrived for God to deliver the Israelites, and the oath that Joseph had imposed upon the children of Israel in  had reached its time of fulfillment. Moses called on Joseph to show himself, and Joseph's coffin immediately rose to the surface of the water.

Noting that  reported the generations from Joseph to the daughters of Zelophehad, the Sifre taught that the daughters of Zelophehad loved the Land of Israel just as much as their ancestor Joseph did (when in  he extracted an oath from his brothers to return his body to the Land of Israel for burial).

The Gemara cited their doing so to support the law that one who is engaged on one religious duty is free from any other.

Rav Judah taught that three things shorten a person's years: (1) to be given a Torah scroll from which to read and to refuse, (2) to be given a cup of benediction over which to say grace and to refuse, and (3) to assume airs of authority.

Rabbi Nathan taught that the Egyptians buried Joseph in the capital of Egypt in the mausoleum of the kings, as  reports, "they embalmed him, and he was put in a coffin in Egypt." Later, Moses stood among the coffins and cried out to Joseph, crying that the oath to redeem God's children that God swore to Abraham had reached its fulfillment. Immediately, Joseph's coffin began to move, and Moses took it and went on his way.

In medieval Jewish interpretation
The parashah is discussed in these medieval Jewish sources:

Genesis chapter 48
Naḥmanides wrote that Jacob spoke to Joseph in an apologetic vein in  so that when Joseph heard Jacob's wish to be buried in the cave of Machpelah, Joseph would not be angered about Jacob's failure to bury Rachel there as Jacob had buried Leah there. For this reason, Jacob told Joseph that Rachel died in the land of Canaan, and she was not buried outside of the Land of Israel in the way that Jacob would be if he were buried in Egypt. Furthermore, Jacob explained that Rachel died on the road suddenly, and Jacob could not bury her in the cave of Machpelah, as he could not leave his children and his flocks on the road to take her body to the cave of Machpelah. As well, Jacob could not find doctors and medicines to embalm her, and thus Jacob told Jacob that "Rachel died by me (alai)."

In modern interpretation
The parashah is discussed in these modern sources:

Genesis chapters 37–50
Donald A. Seybold of Purdue University schematized the Joseph narrative in the chart below, finding analogous relationships in each of Joseph's households.

Ephraim Speiser argued that in spite of its surface unity, the Joseph story, on closer scrutiny, yields two parallel strands similar in general outline, yet markedly different in detail. The Jahwist’s version employed the Tetragrammaton and the name “Israel.” In that version, Judah persuaded his brothers not to kill Joseph but sell him instead to Ishmaelites, who disposed of him in Egypt to an unnamed official. Joseph's new master promoted him to the position of chief retainer. When the brothers were on their way home from their first mission to Egypt with grain, they opened their bags at a night stop and were shocked to find the payment for their purchases. Judah prevailed on his father to let Benjamin accompany them on a second journey to Egypt. Judah finally convinced Joseph that the brothers had really reformed. Joseph invited Israel to settle with his family in Goshen. The Elohist’s parallel account, in contrast, consistently used the names “Elohim” and “Jacob.” Reuben—not Judah—saved Joseph from his brothers; Joseph was left in an empty cistern, where he was picked up, unbeknown to the brothers, by Midianites; they—not the Ishmaelites—sold Joseph as a slave to an Egyptian named Potiphar. In that lowly position, Joseph served—not supervised—the other prisoners. The brothers opened their sacks—not bags—at home in Canaan—not at an encampment along the way. Reuben—not Judah—gave Jacob—not Israel—his personal guarantee of Benjamin's safe return. Pharaoh—not Joseph—invited Jacob and his family to settle in Egypt—not just Goshen. Speiser concluded that the Joseph story can thus be traced back to two once separate, though now intertwined, accounts.

Gary Rendsburg noted that Genesis often repeats the motif of the younger son. Rendsburg explained Genesis's interest with this motif by recalling that David was the youngest of Jesse’s seven sons (see ), and Solomon was among the youngest, if not the youngest, of David's sons (see ). The issue of who among David's many sons would succeed him dominates the Succession Narrative in  through . The two remaining candidates were Adonijah (David's fourth son) and Solomon, and although Adonijah was older (and once claimed the throne when David was old and feeble in ), Solomon won out. Rendsburg argued that even though firstborn royal succession was the norm in the ancient Near East, the authors of Genesis justified Solomonic rule by imbedding the notion of ultimogeniture into Genesis's national epic. An Israelite could thus not criticize David's selection of Solomon to succeed him as king over Israel, because Genesis reported that God had favored younger sons since Abel and blessed younger sons of Israel—Isaac, Jacob, Judah, Joseph, Perez, and Ephraim—since the inception of the covenant. More generally, Rendsburg concluded that royal scribes living in Jerusalem during the reigns of David and Solomon in the tenth century BCE were responsible for Genesis; their ultimate goal was to justify the monarchy in general, and the kingship of David and Solomon in particular; and Genesis thus appears as a piece of political propaganda.

Genesis chapter 48
James Kugel read  to tell that Jacob legally adopted Joseph's sons Ephraim and Manasseh as his own, making them coequal heirs with Jacob's other sons. Thus, while Joseph formerly was entitled to one-twelfth of Jacob's estate, after , Jacob replaced Joseph's single share with the two shares of Ephraim and Manasseh, giving Joseph in effect a double portion. Kugel reported that modern scholars see behind this incident a midcourse correction in Israel's list of tribes. At an early stage, it had become fixed that there were 12 tribes, but then reality changed. Levi had been a tribe like any other with its own tribal land, but then Levi became essentially landless, a scattered people of priests and religious functionaries, with only a few cities of their own. Simeon disappeared. To compensate for at least one of these absences, the territory elsewhere attributed to Joseph was counted as two territories, each with its own ancestor figure, Ephraim and Manasseh. The Israelites told that Joseph had two sons by those names, each a tribal founder.

Genesis chapter 49

Gunther Plaut considered it likely that at a time when the tribes were already in Canaan, although not yet a nation, the author of  collected old tribal songs and memories, wove them into a poem, and incorporated the product into Jacob's life story.

Sarna reported that modern scholars deduce from the Genesis listings of Jacob's sons the evolution of the league of Israelite tribes. These scholars deduce from the listing of Reuben, Simeon, Levi, and Judah as Leah tribes that they were politically related. As their tribal territories were not contiguous, their organizing principle could not have been geographical, and their association must therefore reflect a presettlement reality. These scholars conclude that the six Leah tribes must have originated as a separate fraternity in Mesopotamia that evolved in two distinct stages. The account of the birth of Jacob's sons in  preserves the earliest traditions. The handmaid tribes had a subordinate status. And the tribe of Benjamin was the last to join the Israelite league and came into being in Canaan.

And the words, “Your father's sons shall bow down before you,” reflect that David caused the other tribes to submit to his authority. These scholars thus date the blessing to the time of David or Solomon.

Reading the statement in  that “the ruler’s staff shall not depart from Judah,” Rendsburg saw recognition among tenth-century BCE authors that kingship would continue with David and Solomon's family from the tribe of Judah. Rendsburg cited this as further support for the argument that royal scribes living in Jerusalem during the reigns of David and Solomon in the tenth century BCE were responsible for Genesis.

Genesis chapter 50
Von Rad and scholars following him noted that the Joseph story bears the particular signatures of ancient Near Eastern wisdom literature. Joseph displayed the cardinal sagely virtue of patience, which sages had because they believed that everything happens according to the Divine plan and would turn out for the best. Joseph thus looks like the model of an ancient Near Eastern sage, and the Joseph story looks like a didactic tale designed to teach the basic ideology of wisdom.

Calling this either providence or predestination, Brueggemann argued that God thus worked out God's purpose through and in spite of Egypt, and through and in spite of Joseph and his brothers.

Commandments
According to Maimonides and Sefer ha-Chinuch, there are no commandments in the parashah.

In the liturgy
Many Jews recite  and  three times as part of the Tefilat HaDerech (Wayfarer's Prayer), said on setting out on a journey.

The Weekly Maqam
In the Weekly Maqam, Sephardi Jews each week base the songs of the services on the content of that week's parashah. For Parashat Vayechi, Sephardi Jews apply Maqam Hijaz, the maqam that expresses mourning and sadness, as the parashah contains the death of the patriarch Jacob.

Haftarah
A haftarah is a text selected from the books of Nevi'im ("The Prophets") that is read publicly in the synagogue after the reading of the Torah on Sabbath and holiday mornings. The haftarah usually has a thematic link to the Torah reading that precedes it.

The specific text read following Parashat Vaychi varies according to different traditions within Judaism.

Connection to the Parashah
The parashah and haftarah both report the testaments of seminal leaders of Israel to their sons, the parashah of Jacob (in ) and the haftarah of David. Both the parashah and the haftarah precede the testament with the phrase "the time drew near that [the leader] must die." Both the parashah and the haftarah employ the word "va-yetzav," "he instructed." A Midrash notes that both the parashah and the haftarah use language reflecting the leader's diminution of authority: the parashah reports Jacob entreating his son, "If now I have found favor in your sight . . . In both the parashah and the haftarah, the leaders brought up unpleasant slights that haunted them to their last days: Jacob brought up that his son Reuben defiled Jacob's bed and that his sons Simeon and Levi slew men and beast in their anger; David brought up that his nephew Joab killed Abner and Amasa and that Shemei insulted David on the way to Mahanaim. In so doing, both leaders complained of subordinate family members who acted too zealously on what might be viewed as the leader's behalf: Jacob with regard to Simeon and Levi and David with regard to Joab.

Notes

Further reading
The parashah has parallels or is discussed in these sources:

Biblical
 (Moses's blessing).

 (Deborah's song).
 (David's testament).
 (31:9 in NJPS) (Ephraim as firstborn).

Ancient
Homer. The Iliad Book 9. Greece, 8th–6th century BCE. (Phoenix's father curses Phoenix for sleeping with his concubine).

Early nonrabbinic
Philo. Allegorical Interpretation, I 26:80; Allegorical Interpretation, II 24:94, 26:103; Allegorical Interpretation, III 8:26, 30:90–93, 62:177–81; On the Birth of Abel and the Sacrifices Offered by Him and by His Brother Cain 2:5; On the Migration of Abraham 5:22, 29:159–161; On Dreams 2:15:107–108; On Joseph 42:255–44:270. Alexandria, Egypt, early 1st century. In, e.g., The Works of Philo: Complete and Unabridged, New Updated Edition. Translated by Charles Duke Yonge, pages 34, 48–49, 53, 60, 70–71, 94, 171, 182, 185, 228–29, 233, 250, 254–55, 268–69, 273, 275, 299, 327, 344, 349, 395, 456–58. Peabody, Massachusetts: Hendrickson Publishers, 1993.
Hebrews 11:21-22. Late 1st century.
Josephus. Antiquities 2:7:5–2:8:2. Circa 93–94. In, e.g., The Works of Josephus: Complete and Unabridged, New Updated Edition. Translated by William Whiston, pages 64–66. Peabody, Massachusetts: Hendrickson Publishers, 1987.
Quran 2:133 (Jacob's parting words); 12:94–101 (Jacob, Joseph, and his brothers). Arabia, 7th century.

Classical rabbinic
Mishnah Sotah 1:7–9. Land of Israel, circa 200 CE. In, e.g., The Mishnah: A New Translation. Translated by Jacob Neusner, page 449. New Haven: Yale University Press, 1988.
Tosefta: Sheviit 7:12; Sotah 10:9. Land of Israel, circa 300 CE. In, e.g., The Tosefta: Translated from the Hebrew, with a New Introduction. Translated by Jacob Neusner, pages 242, 877. Peabody, Massachusetts: Hendrickson Publishers, 2002.
Jerusalem Talmud: Peah 8b; Kilayim 80a, 81a; Shabbat 47b; Shekalim 43b; Sukkah 28a; Taanit 10b, 30b; Moed Katan 17a; Yevamot 70b; Ketubot 6a, 69b, 70b; Nedarim 12a; Sotah 8a–b, 39a, 43a; Gittin 30a; Sanhedrin 66a; Avodah Zarah 14b; Horayot 8b, 13b. Tiberias, Land of Israel, circa 400 CE. In, e.g., Talmud Yerushalmi. Edited by Chaim Malinowitz, Yisroel Simcha Schorr, and Mordechai Marcus, volumes 3, 5, 13–14, 20, 25, 28, 30–33, 36–37, 39, 45, 47, 49. Brooklyn: Mesorah Publications, 2006–2020. And in, e.g., The Jerusalem Talmud: A Translation and Commentary. Edited by Jacob Neusner and translated by Jacob Neusner, Tzvee Zahavy, B. Barry Levy, and Edward Goldman. Peabody, Massachusetts: Hendrickson Publishers, 2009.

Genesis Rabbah 6:4, 9; 12:2; 20:9; 30:10; 37:7; 39:12; 40:6; 47:5; 65:9; 66:4; 70:7; 71:2, 7; 72:5; 75:12; 78:10; 80:6, 10; 82:4–5, 10; 87:7; 90:4, 6; 93:7; 95:1; 96:1–100:13; 105. Land of Israel, 5th century. In, e.g., Midrash Rabbah: Genesis. Translated by Harry Freedman and Maurice Simon, volume 1, pages 44, 48, 89, 168, 238, 300, 402; volume 2, pages 585, 603, 640, 653, 658, 665, 698, 722, 739, 743, 754–56, 777, 812, 830–31, 863, 866, 881, 885–1003. London: Soncino Press, 1939.
Babylonian Talmud: Berakhot 20a, 55a–b, 57a; 55b, 139a, 152a; Eruvin 53a; Pesachim 4a, 56a, 118a; Yoma 52b, 87a; Sukkah 25a; Rosh Hashanah 26a; Taanit 5b; Megillah 9a, 16a–b; Chagigah 3b; Yevamot 24a, 65b, 76a; Ketubot 72b, 111a–12a; Nedarim 20b, 30b; Nazir 65a; Sotah 9b–10a, 11b, 13a–b, 36b; Kiddushin 2a; Bava Kamma 17a, 92a, 113b; Bava Metzia 84a, 87a; Bava Batra 118a–b, 123a; Sanhedrin 5a, 22a, 95a, 98b, 105a, 106a, 109b; Avodah Zarah 5b, 11b, 25a; Horayot 5b, 6b, 11b; Zevachim 53b, 54b, 118b; Menachot 37a, 93b; Chullin 92a; 31a, Niddah 36b. In, e.g., Talmud Bavli. Edited by Yisroel Simcha Schorr, Chaim Malinowitz, and Mordechai Marcus, 72 volumes. Brooklyn: Mesorah Pubs., 2006.
Pirke De-Rabbi Eliezer, chapters 17, 32, 36, 38, 39, 48, 52, 53 (circa 750 CE), in, e.g., Pirke de Rabbi Eliezer. Translated and annotated by Gerald Friedlander, pages 115, 238, 270, 288–89, 305, 307–09, 384, 422, 436. London, 1916, reprinted New York: Hermon Press, 1970.

Medieval
Rashi. Commentary. Genesis 47–50. Troyes, France, late 11th century. In, e.g., Rashi. The Torah: With Rashi's Commentary Translated, Annotated, and Elucidated. Translated and annotated by Yisrael Isser Zvi Herczeg, volume 1, pages 521–70. Brooklyn: Mesorah Publications, 1995.
Rashbam. Commentary on the Torah. Troyes, early 12th century. In, e.g., Rabbi Samuel Ben Meir's Commentary on Genesis: An Annotated Translation. Translated by Martin I. Lockshin, pages 330–90. Lewiston, New York: Edwin Mellen Press, 1989.
Abraham ibn Ezra. Commentary on the Torah. Mid-12th century. In, e.g., Ibn Ezra's Commentary on the Pentateuch: Genesis (Bereshit). Translated and annotated by H. Norman Strickman and Arthur M. Silver, pages 410–53. New York: Menorah Publishing Company, 1988.

Maimonides. Mishneh Torah: Hilchot Kri'at Shema (The Laws of Kri'at Shema), chapter 1, halachah 4. Egypt, circa 1170–1180. In, e.g., Mishneh Torah: Hilchot Kri'at Shema: The Laws of Kri'at Shema: and Hilchot Tefilah [I]: The Laws of Prayer. Translated by Eliyahu Touger, volume 5. New York: Moznaim Publishing, 1989.
Maimonides. Mishneh Torah: Hilchot Tefillin, UMezuzah, V'Sefer Torah (The Laws (Governing) Torah Scrolls, Tefillin, and Mezuzot), chapter 1, halachah 1. Egypt, circa 1170–1180. In, e.g., Mishneh Torah: Hilchot Tefillin UMezuzah V'Sefer Torah: The Laws (Governing) Tefillin, Mezuzah, and Torah Scrolls: and Hilchot Tzitzit: The Laws of Tzitzit. Translated by Eliyahu Touger, volume 7. New York: Moznaim Publishing, 1990.
Maimonides. Mishneh Torah: Hilchot Beis Habechirah, chapter 2, halachah 10. Egypt, circa 1170–1180. In, e.g., Mishneh Torah: Sefer Ha'Avodah: The Book of (Temple) Service. Translated by Eliyahu Touger. New York: Moznaim Publishing, 2007.
Maimonides. The Guide for the Perplexed, part 1, chapter 19; part 2, chapter 45. Cairo, Egypt, 1190. In, e.g., Moses Maimonides. The Guide for the Perplexed. Translated by Michael Friedländer, pages 29, 243. New York: Dover Publications, 1956.
Hezekiah ben Manoah. Hizkuni. France, circa 1240. In, e.g., Chizkiyahu ben Manoach. Chizkuni: Torah Commentary. Translated and annotated by Eliyahu Munk, volume 2, pages 324–47. Jerusalem: Ktav Publishers, 2013.
Naḥmanides. The Disputation at Barcelona, pages 11–18. Spain, 1263. In, e.g., Naḥmanides. The Disputation at Barcelona. Translated by Charles B. Chavel, pages 6–10. New York: Shilo Publishing, 1983.
Naḥmanides. Commentary on the Torah. Jerusalem, circa 1270. In, e.g., Ramban (Nachmanides): Commentary on the Torah: Genesis. Translated by Charles B. Chavel, volume 1, pages 568–606. New York: Shilo Publishing House, 1971.

Zohar 1:216a–51a. Spain, late 13th century. In, e.g., The Zohar. Translated by Harry Sperling and Maurice Simon. 5 volumes. London: Soncino Press, 1934.
Baal Ha-Turim. Commentary on the Torah. Early 13th century. In, e.g., Baal Haturim Chumash: Bereshis. Translated by Eliyahu Touger, edited and annotated by Avie Gold, volume 1, pages 441–81. Brooklyn: Mesorah Publications, 1999.
Shem Tov ibn Shem Tov. "Sermon on Wa-Yehi." Spain, 1480s. In Marc Saperstein. Jewish Preaching, 1200–1800: An Anthology, pages 180–98. New Haven: Yale University Press, 1989.
Isaac ben Moses Arama. Akedat Yizhak (The Binding of Isaac). Late 15th century. In, e.g., Yitzchak Arama. Akeydat Yitzchak: Commentary of Rabbi Yitzchak Arama on the Torah. Translated and condensed by Eliyahu Munk, volume 1, pages 276–97. New York, Lambda Publishers, 2001.

Modern
Isaac Abarbanel. Commentary on the Torah. Italy, between 1492–1509. In, e.g., Abarbanel: Selected Commentaries on the Torah: Volume 1: Bereishis/Genesis. Translated and annotated by Israel Lazar, pages 397–421. Brooklyn: CreateSpace, 2015.
Obadiah ben Jacob Sforno. Commentary on the Torah. Venice, 1567. In, e.g., Sforno: Commentary on the Torah. Translation and explanatory notes by Raphael Pelcovitz, pages 256–77. Brooklyn: Mesorah Publications, 1997.
Moshe Alshich. Commentary on the Torah. Safed, circa 1593. In, e.g., Moshe Alshich. Midrash of Rabbi Moshe Alshich on the Torah. Translated and annotated by Eliyahu Munk, volume 1, pages 312–35. New York, Lambda Publishers, 2000.

Avraham Yehoshua Heschel. Commentaries on the Torah. Cracow, Poland, mid 17th century. Compiled as Chanukat HaTorah. Edited by Chanoch Henoch Erzohn. Piotrkow, Poland, 1900. In Avraham Yehoshua Heschel. Chanukas HaTorah: Mystical Insights of Rav Avraham Yehoshua Heschel on Chumash. Translated by Avraham Peretz Friedman, pages 106–13. Southfield, Michigan: Targum Press/Feldheim Publishers, 2004.
Thomas Hobbes. Leviathan, 3:42. England, 1651. Reprint edited by C. B. Macpherson, page 572. Harmondsworth, England: Penguin Classics, 1982.
Chaim ibn Attar. Ohr ha-Chaim. Venice, 1742. In Chayim ben Attar. Or Hachayim: Commentary on the Torah. Translated by Eliyahu Munk, volume 1, pages 383–440. Brooklyn: Lambda Publishers, 1999.

Samuel David Luzzatto (Shadal). Commentary on the Torah. Padua, 1871. In, e.g., Samuel David Luzzatto. Torah Commentary. Translated and annotated by Eliyahu Munk, volume 2, pages 451–504. New York: Lambda Publishers, 2012.
Yehudah Aryeh Leib Alter. Sefat Emet. Góra Kalwaria (Ger), Poland, before 1906. Excerpted in The Language of Truth: The Torah Commentary of Sefat Emet. Translated and interpreted by Arthur Green, pages 73–78. Philadelphia: Jewish Publication Society, 1998. Reprinted 2012.

Hermann Cohen. Religion of Reason: Out of the Sources of Judaism. Translated with an introduction by Simon Kaplan; introductory essays by Leo Strauss, page 405. New York: Ungar, 1972. Reprinted Atlanta: Scholars Press, 1995. Originally published as Religion der Vernunft aus den Quellen des Judentums. Leipzig: Gustav Fock, 1919.

Abraham Isaac Kook. The Lights of Penitence, 16:1. 1925. In Abraham Isaac Kook: the Lights of Penitence, the Moral Principles, Lights of Holiness, Essays, Letters, and Poems. Translated by Ben-Zion Bokser, page 119. Mahwah, N.J.: Paulist Press 1978.
Alexander Alan Steinbach. Sabbath Queen: Fifty-four Bible Talks to the Young Based on Each Portion of the Pentateuch, pages 36–38. New York: Behrman's Jewish Book House, 1936.
Irving Fineman. Jacob, An Autobiographical Novel. New York: Random House, 1941.

Thomas Mann. Joseph and His Brothers. Translated by John E. Woods, pages 53, 102–03, 257, 306, 314, 396, 401, 407, 448–49, 456, 458, 463, 485, 493, 503, 541–42, 547, 568–69, 663, 668, 672, 717–18, 722, 758, 788, 792–94, 796–97, 803–04, 852–53, 859, 878, 881, 886, 923, 1447–92. New York: Alfred A. Knopf, 2005. Originally published as Joseph und seine Brüder. Stockholm: Bermann-Fischer Verlag, 1943.
John M. Allegro. "A Possible Mesopotamian Background to the Joseph Blessing of Gen. xlix." Zeitschrift für die Alttestamentliche Wissenschaft, volume 64 (1952): pages 249–51.
Mitchell J. Dahood. "A New Translation of Gen. 49,6a." Biblica, volume 36 (1955): page 229.
Mitchell J. Dahood. "Is ‘Eben Yiśrā'ēl a Divine Title? (Gen 49,24)." Biblica, volume 40 (1959): pages 1002–7.
Joseph Blenkinsopp. "The Oracle of Judah and the Messianic Entry." Journal of Biblical Literature, volume 80, number 1 (1961): pages 55–64.
Mitchell J. Dahood. "MKRTYHM in Genesis 49:5." Catholic Biblical Quarterly, volume 23 (1961): pages 54–56.
Edwin M. Good. "The ‘Blessing' on Judah, Gen 49:8–12." Journal of Biblical Literature, volume 82 (1963): pages 427–32.
Ephraim A. Speiser. Genesis: Introduction, Translation, and Notes, volume 1, pages 354–78. New York: Anchor Bible, 1964.
Walter Orenstein and Hertz Frankel. Torah and Tradition: A Bible Textbook for Jewish Youth: Volume I: Bereishis, pages 134–44. New York: Hebrew Publishing Company, 1964.
Gerhard von Rad. “The Joseph Narrative and Ancient Wisdom.” In The Problem of the Hexateuch and Other Essays, pages 292–300. New York: McGraw-Hill Book Company, 1966. LCCN 66-11432.
John A. Emerton. "Some Difficult Words in Genesis 49." In Words and Meanings: Essays Presented to David Winton Thomas. Edited by Peter R. Ackroyd and Barnabas Lindars, pages 81–93. Cambridge: Cambridge University Press, 1968.
Calum M. Carmichael. "Some Sayings in Genesis 49." Journal of Biblical Literature, volume 88 (1969): pages 435–44.
Donald B. Redford. A Study of the Biblical Story of Joseph (Genesis 37–50). Boston: Brill Publishers, 1970.
George W. Coats. "The Joseph Story and Wisdom: a Reappraisal." Catholic Biblical Quarterly, volume 35 (1973): pages 285–97.
Eric I. Lowenthal. The Joseph Narrative in Genesis, pages 131–60. Ktav, 1973.
George W. Coats. "Redactional Unity in Genesis 37–50." Journal of Biblical Literature, volume 93 (1974): pages 15–21.
Donald A. Seybold. "Paradox and Symmetry in the Joseph Narrative." In Literary Interpretations of Biblical Narratives. Edited by Kenneth R.R. Gros Louis, with James S. Ackerman & Thayer S. Warshaw, pages 59–73. Nashville: Abingdon Press, 1974.
Stanley Gevirtz. "The Issachar Oracle in the Testament of Jacob." In Nelson Glueck Memorial Volume. Edited by Benjamin Mazar, pages 104–12. Jerusalem: Jewish Institute of Religion, 1975.
Robert P. Gordon. "Targum Onkelos to Genesis 49:4 and a Common Semitic Idiom." The Jewish Quarterly Review, volume 66 (1975–76): pages 224–26.
George W. Coats. From Canaan to Egypt: Structural and Theological Context for the Joseph Story. Washington, D.C.: Catholic Biblical Association, 1976.
R. David Freedman. "‘Put Your Hand Under My Thigh'—The Patriarchal Oath." Biblical Archaeology Review, volume 2, number 2 (June 1976).
Seän M. Warner. “The Patriarchs and Extra-Biblical Sources.” Journal for the Study of the Old Testament, volume 1, number 2 (June 1976): pages 50–61.
J. Maxwell Miller. “The Patriarchs and Extra-Biblical Sources: a Response.” Journal for the Study of the Old Testament, volume 1, number 2 (June 1976): pages 62–66.
Peter D. Miscall. “The Jacob and Joseph Stories as Analogies.” Journal for the Study of the Old Testament, volume 3, number 6 (April 1978): pages 28–40.
Ivan Caine. “Numbers in the Joseph Narrative.” In Jewish Civilization: Essays and Studies: Volume 1. Edited by Ronald A. Brauner, pages 3–17. Philadelphia: Reconstructionist Rabbinical College, 1979. ISSN 0191-3034.
Robert Alter. "Joseph and His Brothers." Commentary, volume 70, number 5 (November 1980): pages 59–69.
Matty Cohen. "MeKērōtēhem (Genèse Xlix 5)." Vetus Testamentum, volume 31 (1981): pages 472–82.
Stanley Gevirtz. "Adumbrations of Dan in Jacob's Blessing on Judah." Zeitschrift für die Alttestamentliche Wissenschaft, volume 83 (1981): pages 21–37.
Nehama Leibowitz. Studies in Bereshit (Genesis), pages 530–70. Jerusalem: The World Zionist Organization, 1981. Reprinted as New Studies in the Weekly Parasha. Lambda Publishers, 2010.
Thomas Blass. "The Tenacity of Impressions and Jacob's Rebuke of Simeon and Levi." Journal of Psychology and Theology, volume 7 (1982): pages 55–61.
Walter Brueggemann. Genesis: Interpretation: A Bible Commentary for Teaching and Preaching, pages 351–80. Atlanta: John Knox Press, 1982.
Walter Brueggemann. "Genesis L 15–21: A Theological Exploration." In Congress Volume: Salamanca, 1983. Edited by J.A. Emerton, pages 40–53. Leiden: Brill Academic Publishers, 1985.
Robert D. Sacks. “The Lion and the Ass: A Commentary on the Book of Genesis (Chapters 44–50).” Interpretation: A Journal of Political Philosophy, volume 12, numbers 2 and 3 (May and September 1984): pages 141–92. In Robert D. Sacks. A Commentary on the Book of Genesis. Lewiston, New York: Edwin Mellen Press, 1990).
Pinchas H. Peli. Torah Today: A Renewed Encounter with Scripture, pages 49–52. Washington, D.C.: B'nai B'rith Books, 1987.
Nahum M. Sarna. The JPS Torah Commentary: Genesis: The Traditional Hebrew Text with the New JPS Translation, pages 323–51. Philadelphia: Jewish Publication Society, 1989.
So That Your Values Live On: Ethical Wills and How to Prepare Them. Edited and annotated by Jack Riemer and Nathaniel Stampfer. Woodstock, Vermont: Jewish Lights Publishing, 1991.

Leon R. Kass. “Assimilation versus Separation, by Aaron Wildavsky: To assimilate or to stay apart?” Commentary. (September 1, 1993).
Aaron Wildavsky. Assimilation versus Separation: Joseph the Administrator and the Politics of Religion in Biblical Israel. New Brunswick, New Jersey: Transaction Publishers, 1993.
Judith S. Antonelli. "The Daughters of Egypt." In In the Image of God: A Feminist Commentary on the Torah, pages 127–34. Northvale, New Jersey: Jason Aronson, 1995.
Naomi H. Rosenblatt and Joshua Horwitz. Wrestling with Angels: What Genesis Teaches Us About Our Spiritual Identity, Sexuality, and Personal Relationships, pages 376–86. Delacorte Press, 1995.
Avivah Gottlieb Zornberg. The Beginning of Desire: Reflections on Genesis, pages 352–81. New York: Image Books/Doubleday, 1995.

Ellen Frankel. The Five Books of Miriam: A Woman’s Commentary on the Torah, pages 87–89. New York: G. P. Putnam's Sons, 1996.
W. Gunther Plaut. The Haftarah Commentary, pages 115–21. New York: UAHC Press, 1996.
Sorel Goldberg Loeb and Barbara Binder Kadden. Teaching Torah: A Treasury of Insights and Activities, pages 77–82. Denver: A.R.E. Publishing, 1997.
Susan Freeman. Teaching Jewish Virtues: Sacred Sources and Arts Activities, pages 69–84. Springfield, New Jersey: A.R.E. Publishing, 1999. (25).
Rachel Adelman. “Serah bat Asher: Songstress, Poet, and Woman of Wisdom.” In Torah of the Mothers: Contemporary Jewish Women Read Classical Jewish Texts. Edited by Ora Wiskind Elper and Susan Handelman, pages 218–43. New York and Jerusalem: Urim Publications, 2000..
John S. Kselman. "Genesis." In The HarperCollins Bible Commentary. Edited by James L. Mays, pages 116–18. New York: HarperCollins Publishers, revised edition, 2000.

Israel Finkelstein and Neil Asher Silberman. “Searching for the Patriarchs.” In The Bible Unearthed: Archaeology's New Vision of Ancient Israel and the Origin of Its Sacred Texts, pages 27–47. New York: The Free Press, 2001.
Lainie Blum Cogan and Judy Weiss. Teaching Haftarah: Background, Insights, and Strategies, pages 110–17. Denver: A.R.E. Publishing, 2002.
Michael Fishbane. The JPS Bible Commentary: Haftarot, pages 75–79. Philadelphia: Jewish Publication Society, 2002.
Robert Alter. The Five Books of Moses: A Translation with Commentary, pages 276–96. New York: W.W. Norton & Co., 2004.
Jon D. Levenson. "Genesis." In The Jewish Study Bible. Edited by Adele Berlin and Marc Zvi Brettler, pages 94–101. New York: Oxford University Press, 2004.
John Van Seters. “The Joseph Story: Some Basic Observations.” In Egypt, Israel, and the Ancient Mediterranean World: Studies in Honor of Donald B. Redford. Edited by Gary N. Knoppers and Antoine Hirsch. Boston: Brill Publishers, 2004.
Professors on the Parashah: Studies on the Weekly Torah Reading Edited by Leib Moscovitz, pages 84–86. Jerusalem: Urim Publications, 2005.
W. Gunther Plaut. The Torah: A Modern Commentary: Revised Edition. Revised edition edited by David E. S. Stern, pages 304–24. New York: Union for Reform Judaism, 2006.
Suzanne A. Brody. "Children's Blessing." In Dancing in the White Spaces: The Yearly Torah Cycle and More Poems, page 74. Shelbyville, Kentucky: Wasteland Press, 2007.
Shmuel Goldin. Unlocking the Torah Text: Bereishit, pages 263–85. Jerusalem: Gefen Publishing House, 2007.
James L. Kugel. How To Read the Bible: A Guide to Scripture, Then and Now, pages 169–72, 175–97, 357–58, 421, 427. New York: Free Press, 2007.
The Torah: A Women's Commentary. Edited by Tamara Cohn Eskenazi and Andrea L. Weiss, pages 281–302. New York: URJ Press, 2008.
Jill Hammer. “Uncovering Joseph’s Bones: Parashat Vayechi (Genesis 47:28–50:26).” In Torah Queeries: Weekly Commentaries on the Hebrew Bible. Edited by Gregg Drinkwater, Joshua Lesser, and David Shneer; foreword by Judith Plaskow, pages 68–72. New York: New York University Press, 2009.
Reuven Hammer. Entering Torah: Prefaces to the Weekly Torah Portion, pages 69–73. New York: Gefen Publishing House, 2009.
Aaron D. Rubin. “Genesis 49:4 in Light of Arabic and Modern South Arabian.” Vetus Testamentum, volume 59, number 3 (2009): pages 499–502.

Jonathan Sacks. Covenant & Conversation: A Weekly Reading of the Jewish Bible: Genesis: The Book of Beginnings, pages 329–53. New Milford, Connecticut: Maggid Books, 2009.
Carolyn J. Sharp. “‘Am I in the Place of God?’: Joseph the Pretender.” In Irony and Meaning in the Hebrew Bible, pages 54–61. Bloomington, Indiana: Indiana University Press, 2009.
John H. Walton. "Genesis." In Zondervan Illustrated Bible Backgrounds Commentary. Edited by John H. Walton, volume 1, pages 135–37. Grand Rapids, Michigan: Zondervan, 2009.
Bradford A. Anderson. “The Inversion of the Birth Order and the Title of the Firstborn.” Vetus Testamentum, volume 60, number 4 (2010): pages 655–58.

Calum Carmichael. The Book of Numbers: A Critique of Genesis, pages 6, 19, 22, 35, 54–57, 70, 74, 117, 139–40, 162, 164, 173, 183–84, 191, 193. New Haven: Yale University Press, 2012.
Shmuel Herzfeld. "Recognizing Your Children." In Fifty-Four Pick Up: Fifteen-Minute Inspirational Torah Lessons, pages 65–70. Jerusalem: Gefen Publishing House, 2012.
Hillel I. Millgram. The Joseph Paradox: A Radical Reading of Genesis 37–50. Jefferson, North Carolina: McFarland and Company, 2012.
Eve Woogen. “The Best of Stories: Yusuf as Joseph in Hebrew Translations of the Qur'an.” Classics Honors Projects. (2012).

Richard C. Steiner. Journal of Biblical Literature, volume 132, number 1 (2013): pages 33–60.
Marcia Falk. "When will we hear of Jacob's daughters?" The Jerusalem Report, volume 25, number 20 (January 12, 2015): page 47.
Jonathan Sacks. Lessons in Leadership: A Weekly Reading of the Jewish Bible, pages 55–58. New Milford, Connecticut: Maggid Books, 2015.
David Fohrman. The Exodus You Almost Passed Over, pages 205–63. Aleph Beta Press, 2016.
Katie M. Heffelfinger. “From Bane to Blessing: The Food Leitmotif in Genesis 37–50.” Journal for the Study of the Old Testament, volume 40, number 3 (March 2016): pages 297–320.*“The Hittites: Between Tradition and History.” Biblical Archaeology Review, volume 42, number 2 (March/April 2016): pages 28–40, 68.
Jean-Pierre Isbouts. Archaeology of the Bible: The Greatest Discoveries From Genesis to the Roman Era, pages 80–87. Washington, D.C.: National Geographic, 2016.
Jonathan Sacks. Essays on Ethics: A Weekly Reading of the Jewish Bible, pages 71–76. New Milford, Connecticut: Maggid Books, 2016.
Amy Soule. Queer Jewish Notions: Proof That God Isn't a Homophobe, pages 33–35. Bloomington, Indiana: iUniverse, 2016.
Shai Held. The Heart of Torah, Volume 1: Essays on the Weekly Torah Portion: Genesis and Exodus, pages 109–19. Philadelphia: Jewish Publication Society, 2017.
James L. Kugel. The Great Shift: Encountering God in Biblical Times, pages 26, 369, 397. Boston: Houghton Mifflin Harcourt, 2017.

Steven Levy and Sarah Levy. The JPS Rashi Discussion Torah Commentary, pages 36–38. Philadelphia: Jewish Publication Society, 2017.
Bill Dauster. "Why Didn’t God Stop Them?" Washington Jewish Week, Jan. 9, 2020, page 31.
Andrew Tobolowsky. "The Problem of Reubenite Primacy: New Paradigms, New Answers." Journal of Biblical Literature, volume 139, number 1 (2020): pages 27–45.
Liana Finck. Let There Be Light: The Real Story of Her Creation, pages 317–19. New York: Random House, 2022.

External links

Texts
Masoretic text and 1917 JPS translation
Hear the parashah chanted
Hear the parashah read in Hebrew

Commentaries

Academy for Jewish Religion, California
Academy for Jewish Religion, New York
Aish.com
Akhlah: The Jewish Children's Learning Network
Aleph Beta Academy
American Jewish University—Ziegler School of Rabbinic Studies
Anshe Emes Synagogue, Los Angeles
Ari Goldwag
Ascent of Safed
Bar-Ilan University
Chabad.org
eparsha.com
G-dcast
The Israel Koschitzky Virtual Beit Midrash
Jewish Agency for Israel
Jewish Theological Seminary
Mechon Hadar
Miriam Aflalo 
MyJewishLearning.com
Ohr Sameach
Orthodox Union
OzTorah, Torah from Australia
Oz Ve Shalom—Netivot Shalom
Pardes from Jerusalem
Professor James L. Kugel
Rabbi Dov Linzer
Rabbi Fabian Werbin
Rabbi Jonathan Sacks
Rabbi Shlomo Riskin
Rabbi Shmuel Herzfeld
Rabbi Stan Levin
Reconstructionist Judaism 
Sephardic Institute
Shiur.com
613.org Jewish Torah Audio
Tanach Study Center
Teach613.org, Torah Education at Cherry Hill
TheTorah.com
Torah from Dixie
Torah.org
TorahVort.com
Union for Reform Judaism
United Synagogue of Conservative Judaism 
What's Bothering Rashi?
Yeshivat Chovevei Torah
Yeshiva University

Weekly Torah readings in Tevet
Weekly Torah readings from Genesis